Lieutenant-Colonel Guy Percy Wyndham  (19 January 1865 – 17 April 1941) was a British Army soldier.

Background and family
Wyndham was born on 19 January 1865 as the son of Hon. Percy Wyndham and Madeline Caroline Frances Eden Campbell. He was the brother of George Wyndham and Mary Constance Wyndham.

He was married twice, first in 1892 to Edwina Johanna Fitzpatrick (who died in 1919), then in 1923 to Violet Leverson, daughter and biographer of writer Ada Leverson. His son with Violet Leverson was the writer and editor Francis Wyndham.

Military career

Wyndham was commissioned into the 16th (the Queen's) Lancers in August 1884. He was promoted captain on 10 September 1890, and major on 1 April 1900. On the outbreak of the Second Boer War in late 1899, Wyndham went to South Africa where he served on the Staff, and was present at the Relief of Ladysmith. During the later parts of the war he was in command of a Column. For his services he was mentioned in dispatches (including the final despatch by Lord Kitchener dated 23 June 1902), and received the brevet rank of lieutenant-colonel on 29 November 1900. He returned to the United Kingdom on the steamer Dunvegan Castle in April 1902, and the residents of his home village of Upwey, Dorset had decorated the village on his arrival there. Two months later, he was received in audience by King Edward VII, who personally presented him with the King's South Africa Medal.

As British military attaché in St. Petersburg, Russia, in 1909 he first warned his Austrian counterpart that an Austrian General Staff officer was supplying top secret information to the Russians.  This information, however, ended up on the desk of Alfred Redl, head of counter-intelligence at the Evidenzbureau in Vienna, who unfortunately was the very spy being sought.

Guy Percy Wyndham was a member of The Souls.

Works
 Life and letters of George Wyndham.  Guy Percy Wyndham, John William Mackail.  London: Hutchinson, 1925. Two volumes.

References

Sources
 

16th The Queen's Lancers officers
British diplomats
Members of the Royal Victorian Order
Companions of the Order of the Bath
1865 births
1941 deaths
Guy